= Hewitt G. Youtz =

American politician

Member of the Wyoming Senate
- In office 1981–1982

Personal details
- Born: October 7, 1922 San Francisco, California, U.S.
- Died: March 27, 2012 (aged 89)
- Party: Republican
- Education: University of Wyoming

Hewitt G. Youtz (October 7, 1922 – March 27, 2012) was an American politician. He served as a Republican member of the Wyoming Senate.

== Life and career ==
Youtz was born in San Francisco, California. He attended the University of Wyoming.

Youtz served in the Wyoming Senate from 1981 to 1982.

Youtz died on March 27, 2012, at the age of 89.
